The 1898 Carlisle Indians football team represented the Carlisle Indian Industrial School as an independent during the 1898 college football season. Led by John A. Hall in his first only season as head coach, the Indians compiled a 6–4 record and outscored opponents by a total of 203 to 99. 

Key players included Frank Cayou, Frank Hudson, Bemus Pierce, Hawley Pierce, and Eddie Rogers. Hudson was selected by Outing magazine as the first-team quarterback on its 1898 All-America college football team.

Schedule

References

Carlisle
Carlisle Indians football seasons
Carlisle Indians football